"I Can't Escape from You" is the fourth and final single from Act. The single reached No. 90 on the UK Singles Chart.

The 12" featured a cover of the Smiths' "Heaven Knows I'm Miserable Now" as a bonus track. This would eventually be released on the CD version of the album Laughter, Tears and Rage three months later.

Track listing 
All songs written and composed by Thomas Leer and Claudia Brücken, except where noted.

7" vinyl 
 UK: ZTT / IMM 2

12" vinyl 
 UK: ZTT / TIMM 2

CD 
 UK: ZTT / CDIMM 2 (subtitled "Compacted")

References

1988 songs
1988 singles
Act (band) songs
Song recordings produced by Stephen Lipson
ZTT Records singles